The Dreamlife of Angels is a 1998 French drama film directed by Erick Zonca. The film was selected as the French entry for the Best Foreign Language Film at the 71st Academy Awards, but was not accepted as a nominee.

Plot
The film is about two working class women, Isa and Marie. Isa is a drifter and searching for a lover whom she had met during the summer. When she realizes that her search for him is futile and turns elsewhere, she meets Marie, who lives in a small French town near Lille. The two young women instantly find a connection as they both have been treated harshly by life and are living from day to day in short-time jobs, such as working in a textile factory or delivering leaflets in the streets. Marie lives in an apartment that she is looking after because the owners had a car accident in which everyone died, except for Sandrine, a teenager, who is in a coma. Marie invites Isa to live with her. Shortly thereafter Isa and Marie meet up with two bouncers, Fredo and Charly, whom they befriend. The men help them out and they have genuine fun together, although they are not much better off than the women.

Isa is the kind of girl who always lands on her own two feet and has a casual c'est la vie attitude when it comes to life and generally doesn't let the hardships get to her, while Marie finds it hard to express herself emotionally, and gets angry when she feels vulnerable. Marie cannot put up with the way she is tossed around by the world, and so, despite being in a relationship with Charly, she tries to escape through a local playboy, Chriss, a rich nightclub owner, who regularly goes out with girls and views Marie as just another one of his random flings. Isa is tougher in that she can take the beating and stick with what is around her, and does not get carried away by the false possibility of a better life. Significantly, Isa refuses to sleep with her casual boyfriend Fredo, drawing her strength from within, while Marie is emotionally dependent on Chriss, who, it is clear, does not love her. Isa is well aware of Chriss's true intentions and tries to warn Marie, who refuses to listen.

Isa finds Sandrine's diary and reads it to her during visits in the hospital. Meanwhile, Chriss decides to end his fling with Marie. Instead of breaking up with her in person, he asks Isa to tell her for him (she replies "it's not for me to tell her"), clearly afraid Marie would self-destruct in front of him, then leaving Marie's later calls unreturned. Meanwhile, Sandrine comes out of her coma, but Isa, who has visited her so faithfully while she was in a coma, decides not to see her while she is awake. After finally learning about Chriss' decision to end the relationship, Marie jumps out of a window. The film ends with Isa starting to work in a new factory.

Cast
 Élodie Bouchez as Isabelle 'Isa' Tostin 
 Natacha Régnier as Marie Thomas 
 Grégoire Colin as Chriss
 Patrick Mercado as Charly 
 Jo Prestia as Fredo 
 Louise Motte as Sandrine
 Frédérique Hazard as Marie's mother
 Corinne Masiero as Hollywood's woman
 Francine Massenhave as hospital attendant 
 Zivko Niklevski as Yugoslavian textile employer
 Murielle Colvez as shop foreperson
 Lyazid Ouelhadj as ticket salesman
 Jean-Michel Lemahieu as the intern
 Rosa Maria as the first nurse

Comas in films 
Research by Dr. Eelco Wijdicks on the depiction of comas in movies was published in Neurology in May 2006.  Dr. Wijdicks studied 30 films (made between 1970 and 2004) that portrayed actors in prolonged comas, and he concluded that only two films accurately depicted the state of a coma victim and the agony of waiting for a patient to awaken: Reversal of Fortune (1990), which was based on actual events, and The Dreamlife of Angels (1998). The remaining 28 were criticised for portraying miraculous awakenings with no lasting side effects; unrealistic depictions of treatments and equipment required; and comatose patients remaining tanned, muscular, and suspiciously well turned out.

Awards
 1998 Cannes Film Festival
 Won: Best Actress award: Élodie Bouchez and Natacha Régnier
 Nominated: Palme d'Or
 1999 César Awards
 Won: Best Actress: Élodie Bouchez
 Won: Best Film
 Won: Most Promising Actress: Natacha Régnier 
 Nominated: Best Cinematography: Agnès Godard
 Nominated: Best Director: Erick Zonca
 Nominated: Best First Work: Erick Zonca
 Nominated: Best Writing - Original or Adaptation: Erick Zonca and Roger Bohbot
 1999 Lumières Awards
 Won: Best Film
 Won: Best Director: Erick Zonca
 Won: Best Actress: Élodie Bouchez

Trivia

The Dreamlife of Angels is the film seen in the cinema by the couple in the film High Fidelity.

See also
 List of submissions to the 71st Academy Awards for Best Foreign Language Film
 List of French submissions for the Academy Award for Best Foreign Language Film

References

External links
 La Vie Rêvée des Anges at the BFI
 
 
 
 Review at Salon.com
 sonypictures.com

1998 films
French drama films
1998 drama films
Best Film César Award winners
Films featuring a Best Actress César Award-winning performance
Films featuring a Best Actress Lumières Award-winning performance
Films whose director won the Best Director Lumières Award
European Film Awards winners (films)
Films directed by Erick Zonca
Films scored by Yann Tiersen
Best Film Lumières Award winners
Mass media portrayals of the working class
1990s French-language films
1990s French films